Jone Spartano (born 8 December 1927) is an Italian retired professional football player. He was born in Castellammare di Stabia.

Career
Spartano began his football career with Ercolanese before joining Napoli. He played for 6 seasons (113 games, 9 goals) in the Serie A for S.S.C. Napoli, A.S. Roma, Udinese Calcio and Calcio Catania.

References

1927 births
Possibly living people
Italian footballers
Serie A players
Serie B players
S.S.C. Napoli players
A.S. Roma players
Udinese Calcio players
Brescia Calcio players
Catania S.S.D. players

Association football midfielders